Zhizdrinsky District is an administrative and municipal district (raion), one of the twenty-four in Kaluga Oblast, Russia. It is located in the south of the oblast. Its administrative center is the town of Zhizdra. Population:  The population of Zhizdra accounts for 55.0% of the district's total population.

References

Notes

Sources

Districts of Kaluga Oblast